Mater Misericordiae Hospital may refer to:

Australia 
Mater Misericordiae Hospital, Brisbane
Mater Misericordiae Hospital, Bundaberg
Mater Misericordiae Hospital, Mackay
Mater Misericordiae Hospital, Rockhampton
Mater Misericordiae Hospital, Townsville
Mater Hospital, North Sydney (formerly the Mater Misericordiae Hospital, North Sydney)

Ireland 
 Mater Misericordiae University Hospital, Dublin

New Zealand
Mater Misericordiae Hospital, Dunedin, now Mercy Hospital